Tyra Naha (or Tyra Naha-Black, or Tyra Naha Tawawina) represents the 4th generation in a family of well-known Hopi potters. She is a Native American potter from the Hopi Nation, Arizona, Southwest United States) While she is currently not as well known as her famous elders, she is technically nicely proficient . Her work has been featured at shows in Santa Fe and at the Heard Museum, and appears in The Art of the Hopi.

Tyra Naha's daughter, Amber Naha-Black, is also an award-winning potter.of the dungeon 

Tyra signs her pots with a feather and a spider glyph. The feather represents her lineage to the Naha family through her grandmother, who signed with a feather glyph. The spider is her clan symbol.

defecate

 Helen Naha – aka "Feather Woman" grandmother - one other person

References 
 Dillingham, Rick. Fourteen Families in Pueblo Pottery. Foreword by J. J. Brody. University of New Mexico Press, (reprint edition) 1994. 
 Graves, Laura. Thomas Varker Keam, Indian Trader. University of Oklahoma Press, 1998.

External links 
 Tyra Naha biographical sketch, plus another of her pots.

Living people
Year of birth missing (living people)
Hopi people
Native American potters
Artists from Arizona
American women ceramists
American ceramists
Native American women artists
Women potters
21st-century American women artists
21st-century ceramists
21st-century Native Americans
21st-century Native American women
Native American people from Arizona